The Blue Racer is a series of 17 theatrical cartoons produced from 1972 to 1974 created by Friz Freleng and David H. DePatie. The character's first cartoon, Snake in the Gracias, was released theatrically on January 24, 1971.

Production 
The cartoons are directed by Art Davis, Gerry Chiniquy, Sid Marcus, Robert McKimson, David Deneen, Bob Balser, Cullen Houghtaling and produced by David H. DePatie and Friz Freleng. The majority of the cartoons were animated at the DePatie-Freleng studio, except for two done overseas: Aches and Snakes at Australia's Filmgraphics studio, and Little Boa Peep at Spain's Pegbar Productions.

Plot 
A fast-moving blue snake named the Blue Racer (voiced by Larry D. Mann) tries unsuccessfully to catch a stereotypically-Japanese beetle (voiced by Tom Holland), who is a black belt in karate. Both characters spun off from Tijuana Toads in "Hop and Chop" (the Japanese beetle) and "Snake in the Gracias" (the Blue Racer). The goofy crane from Tijuana Toads (Crazylegs Crane, who also repeatedly failed to collar the Racer and the Toads himself) also later appeared in the series as well. 17 cartoons were produced.

Production 
 Bob Holt voiced both the Blue Racer and the Japanese Beetle in the 1972 short Support Your Local Serpent.
 The Japanese Beetle's last appearance was in the 1972 short Blue Racer Blues.

Filmography 
All cartoons were written by John W. Dunn.

Other appearances 
The Blue Racer (or a snake looking just like him) appeared in the 1978 Pink Panther cartoon "Pinktails for Two" where he mistook the Panther's pink tail for a lady snake. In this film, the Blue Racer did not speak or move with super-speed.

Home video 
All 17 shorts were available on DVD and Blu-ray on May 30, 2017 from Kino Lorber (through their deal with MGM Home Entertainment). Extras included were audio commentaries and two featurettes.

References

External links 
 Big Cartoon Database
 The Blue Racer at Don Markstein's Toonopedia. Archived from the original on February 22, 2018.

Film series introduced in 1972
Animated film series
DePatie–Freleng Enterprises
Animated films about snakes
The Pink Panther Show